Light and the Sufferer is a 2007 American science fiction film starring Paul Dano, Paz de la Huerta, Michael Esper, and Paul D'Amato and directed by Christopher Peditto. It is based on a short story by Jonathan Lethem.

The film is about two brothers who try to leave New York City for a new life in California, only to find their plans and lives changed forever by the appearance of a mysterious alien.

References

External links
 
 
 

2007 science fiction films
American science fiction films
Films based on short fiction
2000s English-language films
2000s American films